Kenneth Charles "Jethro" Burns (March 10, 1920 – February 4, 1989) was an American mandolinist and one-half of the comedy duo Homer and Jethro with Henry D. "Homer" Haynes.

Biography 

Burns was born in Conasauga, Tennessee, on March 10, 1920.  His family moved to Knoxville, Tennessee when he was three. In 1936, he auditioned for a talent contest at Knoxville radio station WNOX where he met Henry Haynes, also 16. The two formed a duo and WNOX program director Lowell Blanchard gave them the stage names Homer and Jethro after forgetting their names on the air.

Burns was drafted into the US Army and served in Europe during World War II and reunited with Haynes, who had served in the Pacific, in Knoxville in 1945. By 1947, the duo moved to Cincinnati, Ohio and were working at WLW on the station's Midwestern Hayride. They signed with King Records, where they worked as a house band and recorded singles on their own, and two years later signed with RCA Records. The pair were fired along with other stars by new management at WLW in 1948, and after a brief tour, they moved to Springfield, Missouri, and performed on KWTO with Chet Atkins, the Carter Family and Slim Wilson.

In 1949, they moved to Chicago and played at the Chicago Theatre. Between shows, they would go to WLS to appear live on National Barn Dance.  While performing on WLS, Burns met and married his wife, Lois Johnson, who he called Gussie. Her twin sister Leona was married to Atkins.

In 1959, they won a Grammy for the best comedy performance in 1959 for "The Battle of Kookamonga", a parody of Johnny Horton's "Battle of New Orleans".

Burns was a highly-influential mandolin stylist, preferring clean single-note jazzy melodies and sophisticated chords over the dominant bluegrass stylings of Bill Monroe, and since he performed mostly in a country music setting, introduced many country mandolinists to sophisticated jazz harmonies and improvisational techniques, as well as standards from the songbooks of Duke Ellington, Django Reinhardt and Cole Porter.

By the 1970s, Burns' influence had spread to a younger generation of bluegrass and "new-acoustic" musicians, most notably New Grass Revival mandolinist Sam Bush.  His participation in Norman Blake/Tut Taylor/Sam Bush/Butch Robins/Vassar Clements/David Holland/Jethro Burns, an independently released album produced by promoter Hank Deane, was reportedly at Bush's suggestion. During that same decade, Burns' acquaintance with bluegrass mandolinist David Grisman led to Burns' writing a number of music/humor columns in the Grisman-published journal Mandolin World News.  Grisman also produced a 1978 duet album on Kaleidoscope Records, Back to Back, featuring Burns and Western swing electric mandolinist Tiny Moore.  Although Burns and Moore were approximately the same age and were among the few of their generation to make their reputations playing jazz and swing mandolin, the two had never met prior to the production of the album, its liner notes report.

After Haynes died in 1971, Burns's regular musical partner was guitarist Ken Eidson, with whom he co-authored an influential mandolin method tome (Mel Bay's Complete Jethro Burns Mandolin Book, still in print), and they continued to perform as Homer and Jethro.  After the partnership ended, Burns continued to play, most notably with Chicago folk singer Steve Goodman. He appeared on several of Goodman's albums and also toured nationally with him. At times he appeared in the Million Dollar Band on TV's Hee Haw with Atkins and swing fiddler Johnny Gimble. He also became a master teacher of mandolin jazz.

He died in 1989 from prostate cancer in Evanston, Illinois.

Honors 
In 2001, Burns and Haynes as Homer and Jethro were posthumously inducted into the Country Music Hall of Fame.

Discography

As leader 
 S'Wonderful: 4 Giants of Swing (1976)
 Jethro Burns (Vivid Sound, 1977)
 Back to Back (Kaleidoscope, 1980)
 Tea for One (Kaleidoscope, 1982)
 Old Friends (Rebel, 1983)
 Jethro Live (Flying Fish, 1990)
 Swing Low, Sweet Mandolin (Acoustic Disc, 1995)
 Bye Bye Blues (Acoustic Disc, 1997)
 The Puritan Sessions (Acoustic Disc, 1998)

As co-leader and sideman 
As Homer and Jethro
 1960 Homer & Jethro at the Country Club
 1962 Playing It Straight
 1963 Ooh, That's Corny!
 1968 Cool Cool Christmas

With Steve Goodman
 1975 Jessie's Jig & Other Favorites
 1976 Words We Can Dance To
 1983 Artistic Hair
 1983 Affordable Art
 1987 Unfinished Business
 2006 Live at the Earl of Old Town

With others
 1958 I'll Sail My Ship Alone, Moon Mullican
 1975 Norman Blake/Tut Taylor/Sam Bush/Butch Robins/Vassar Clements/David Holland/Jethro Burns
 1976 S'Wonderful: 4 Giants of Swing
 1978 Bruised Orange, John Prine
 1978 Joe in Chicago, Joe Venuti
 1979 Back to Back, Tiny Moore
 1979 Rhapsody for Banjo, Larry McNeely
 1985 Late as Usual, Sam Bush
 1987 Buddies of Swing, Peter Ostroushko
 1993 Freight Train Boogie, The Delmore Brothers
 1994 Jazz from the Hills, Country All Stars
 1996 DGQ-20, David Grisman Quintet
 1996 Rose Marie, Slim Whitman
 1996 The Last Letter, Rex Griffin
 2002 Hillbilly Bebop, Hank Penny
 2005 Keep on the Sunny Side: Her Life in Music, June Carter Cash
 2006 Blue Suede Shoes: Gonna Shake This Shack Tonight, Pee Wee King
 2007 The Early Years 1946–1957, Chet Atkins

References 

General sources
Homer and Jethro biography at Britannica.com

.

External links 

Lessons given by Jethro Burns and recorded by his students.
David Grisman and Don Stiernberg Discuss Jethro Burns Legacy

1920 births
1989 deaths
Deaths from cancer in Illinois
Deaths from prostate cancer
American country singer-songwriters
Musicians from Knoxville, Tennessee
Million Dollar Band (country music group) members
Country musicians from Tennessee
20th-century American singers
American bluegrass mandolinists
American country mandolinists
American jazz mandolinists
American comedy musicians
Grammy Award winners
Singer-songwriters from Tennessee
Country Music Hall of Fame inductees
20th-century American comedians
United States Army personnel of World War II